Cresco Township is a township in Kossuth County, Iowa, United States.

History
Cresco Township was organized in 1858.

References

Townships in Kossuth County, Iowa
Townships in Iowa
1858 establishments in Iowa
Populated places established in 1858